Spasić is a Serbian surname.

Geographical distribution
As of 2014, 84.9% of all known bearers of the surname Spasić were residents of Serbia (frequency 1:748), 6.6% of Kosovo (1:2,516), 5.2% of the Republic of Macedonia (1:3,578), 1.3% of Montenegro (1:4,241) and 1.2% of Bosnia and Herzegovina (1:26,386).

In Serbia, the frequency of the surname was higher than national average (1:748) in the following regions:
 1. Pirot District (1:170)
 2. Pčinja District (1:253)
 3. Jablanica District (1:276)
 4. Nišava District (1:289)
 5. Braničevo District (1:412)
 6. Zaječar District (1:432)
 7. Pomoravlje District (1:438)
 8. Podunavlje District (1:518)
 9. Bor District (1:530)
 10. Šumadija District (1:578)
 11. Rasina District (1:582)
 12. Toplica District (1:644)

People
Jovan Spasić (1909–1981), football goalkeeper
Irena Spasić, computer scientist
Milan Spasić (1909–1941), navy officer
Nikola Spasić (1838–1916), businessman, benefactor and humanitarian
Petar Spasić (born 1992), footballer
Predrag Spasić (born 1965), footballer
Slađan Spasić (born 1973), footballer
Slobodan Spasić (born 1977), sprinter

References

Serbian surnames